Blenheim is a historic home located near Ballsville, Powhatan County, Virginia. It is a -story, U-shaped vernacular frame dwelling.  The earliest section is dated to the 18th century, with the two 19th-century wings, dating to 1803–06 and the mid-1830s. Three minor 20th-century additions have also been constructed.  Also on the property is a contributing smokehouse.

It was added to the National Register of Historic Places in 1986.

References

Houses on the National Register of Historic Places in Virginia
Houses completed in 1799
Houses in Powhatan County, Virginia
National Register of Historic Places in Powhatan County, Virginia